Mohammad Shahi (also Romanized as Moḩammad Shāhī and Muhammad Shahi) is a village in Angali Rural District, in the Central District of Bushehr County, Bushehr Province, Iran. At the 2006 census, its population was 68, in 16 families.

References 

Populated places in Bushehr County